A'asu or Āsu is a village on the north coast of Tutuila Island, American Samoa. It is located to the west of Fagasa and northwest of Pago Pago. It is one of multiple villages involved in an archaeological survey of the island. Massacre Bay can be visited by car, aiga buses, or through excursions offered by North Shore Tours.

A'asu has no road outlets, and can only be reached by hiking trails. It is a near-abandoned village which is home to just a few families. It is possible to camp in the village before returning to A'asufou. A'asu might be most famous for a battle which took place on December 11, 1787, where twelve Europeans and 39 Samoans were killed. A monument erected by the French can be found in Aasutuai (old A'asu).

The village of A'asu along with A'oloau are jointly called 'O Leasina.

History

In 1722, Samoa had its first contact with Europeans, a Dutchman named Jacob Roggeveen. Others came later, such as, in 1768, Louis-Antoine de Bougainville and Jean-François de Galaup, comte de Lapérouse in 1787. An incident occurred, in which 12 members of Perouse's crew died at Massacre Bay in A'asu. In response to this, a monument was erected by the French government in 1883 to commemorate the event; it is listed on the National Register of Historic Places.

On December 11, 1787, Paul Antoine Fleuriot de Langle along with sixty men in two cutters and two longboats entered the bay of Aasu. The tide was low and only the boats were able to make the passage to shore through the narrow channel. An increasing number of native Samoans arrived at the site, an estimated 1,500 Samoans were on or near the coast. For an unknown reason, a Samoan woman was hurt in her eye. De Langle got his men in the longboats, but the low tide slowed their retreat from Aasu. The Samoans began throwing rocks and De Langle was hit, fell from the vessel and died. Eleven more were killed before the French were able to swim the channel or wade over the reef to reach their cutters. Canoes approaching the cutters were kept at bay by repeated volleys of rifle fire.

The monument was erected by the French government in 1883 and likely stands over the graves of killed Frenchmen. The monument consists of a rectangular concrete structure surrounded by a low concrete wall. Inside the concrete walls is a bronze plaque and cross. The cross is approximately eight feet high and the concrete structure about 7x15 feet. The monument is maintained by the village of Aasu. The massacre took place on the channel and beach right below the monument.

Demographics

Geography
Most of the village and all of its inhabitants reside in Leasina County in the Western District, however, a small portion of the village (0.04 sq. mi.) is located in Ituau County in the Eastern District.

The village is divided in half by the Aasu Stream which flows down from the high ground behind and cuts a channel through the off-lying reef. It is located in a "cul-de-sac" between mountain spurs.

In 1985, Massacre Bay was designated the first marine sanctuary in the United States. It is also the smallest marine sanctuary in the country, at a quarter of a square mile.

See also
National Register of Historic Places listings in American Samoa

References

Villages in American Samoa
Tutuila
Conflict sites on the National Register of Historic Places
National Register of Historic Places in American Samoa